The SCW Brass Knuckles Championship (also called the SCW Brass Knuckles Championship Trophy) was a professional wrestling hardcore championship in Southern Championship Wrestling (SCW). It remained active until November 20, 2004 when SCW was closed.

The inaugural champion was Major DeBeers, who defeated Viper in a tournament final on May 19, 1995 to become the first SCW Brass Knuckles Champion. Jesse Drive holds the record for most reigns, with three. At 497 days, Trailer Park Heat's first and only reign is the longest in the title's history. The Shah of Grog's first and only reign was the shortest in the history of the title as it was won during a "New Jersey Drive" match, in which the title could change hands multiple times within a 10 min. period, losing it to Jesse Drive before the end of the match. Overall, there have been 30 reigns shared between 23 wrestlers, with nine vacancies, and 1 deactivation.

Title history
Key

Names

Reigns

List of combined reigns

Footnotes

References
General

Specific

External links
SCWprowrestling.com
SCW North Carolina Title at Genickbruch.com

Southern Championship Wrestling championships
Hardcore wrestling championships